The Hewett Academy (formerly the Hewett School) is a coeducational secondary school located in the south of the English city of Norwich.

History
The school used to comprise three schools. Lakenham Boys' and Lakenham Girls' Secondary modern schools (East and West Site) were built in the 1950s. In 1958, the Hewett Grammar School was built next to Hall Road (now the South Site) following its move from former Junior Technical School based at Norwich City College. In 1970 all three schools were combined to form a comprehensive school, under headteacher Walter Roy.

In March 2015 the Department for Education issued an Academy Order which forced the Hewett School to convert to academy status. The order was issued after the school was deemed "inadequate" by an Ofsted inspection and was placed in special measures. However, 1,300 people signed a petition against the order. However, the school became an academy in September 2015 and is now sponsored by the Inspiration Trust.

On 26 November 2015, the school, along with the Sir Isaac Newton Sixth Form, was evacuated due to a suspected bomb threat.

In April 2018 the school was rated "good" by Ofsted.

In November 2018, centenarian former test cricketer Eileen Ash opened a sports hall named in her honour at the school.

Notable former pupils
Alan Brind, violinist
Dominic Hubbard, 6th Baron Addington
Jake Humphrey, television presenter
Poppy Miller, actor
Beth Orton, singer-songwriter
Paige, WWE wrestler and personality
 Timothy Softley, chemist
Ben Stephenson, BBC controller of drama
Tim Westwood, BBC Radio 1 DJ

References

Secondary schools in Norfolk
Educational institutions established in 1958
Schools in Norwich
1958 establishments in England
Academies in Norfolk
Inspiration Trust